De Castellane is a Champagne producer based in the Épernay region of Champagne. The house, founded in 1895, produces both vintage and non-vintage cuvee as well as a blanc de blancs Chardonnay Champagne. The house is currently under the ownership of Laurent-Perrier.

See also
 List of Champagne houses

References

Champagne producers